Can (stylized in all caps) was a German experimental rock band formed in Cologne in 1968 by Holger Czukay (bass, tape editing), Irmin Schmidt (keyboards), Michael Karoli (guitar), and Jaki Liebezeit (drums). The group used several vocalists, most prominently the American Malcolm Mooney (1968–70) and the Japanese Damo Suzuki (1970–73). They have been widely hailed as pioneers of the German krautrock scene.

Coming from backgrounds in the avant-garde and jazz, Can blended elements of psychedelic rock, funk, and musique concrète on influential albums such as Tago Mago (1971), Ege Bamyasi (1972) and Future Days (1973). Can also had commercial success with singles such as "Spoon" (1971) and "I Want More" (1976) reaching national singles charts. Their work has influenced rock, post-punk, ambient, and electronic acts.

History

Origins: 1966–1968

The roots of Can can be traced back to Irmin Schmidt and a trip that he made to New York City in 1966. While Schmidt initially spent his time with avant-garde musicians such as Steve Reich, La Monte Young and Terry Riley, he was also eventually exposed to the world of Andy Warhol and Hotel Chelsea. In his own words, the trip "corrupted" him, sparking a fascination with the possibilities of rock music. Upon his return to Cologne later that year, an inspired Schmidt formed a group with American avant-garde composer and flautist David C. Johnson and music teacher Holger Czukay with the intention of exploring his newly broadened horizons.

Up to that point, the inclinations of all three musicians had been exclusively avant-garde classical. In fact, both Schmidt and Czukay had directly studied under the influential composer Karlheinz Stockhausen. Schmidt chose to play organ and piano, while Czukay played bass and was able to record their music with a basic two-track tape machine. The group was soon fleshed out by guitarist Michael Karoli, a 19-year-old pupil of Czukay, and drummer Jaki Liebezeit, who had grown disenchanted with his work in free jazz groups. As the group developed a more rock-oriented sound, a disappointed Johnson left the group at the end of 1968.

The band used the names "Inner Space" and "the Can" before finally settling on Can, stylised in all caps. Mooney suggested the name due to its positive meanings in various languages. For example, in Turkish, a language much heard in Germany, "can" may mean, depending on the context, "life, soul, heart, spirit, beloved and vitality". Liebezeit later suggested the backformation acronym "Communism, Anarchism, Nihilism", after an English magazine claimed this was the intended meaning.

Early years: 1968–1970
Around September 1968, the band enlisted the creative, highly rhythmic, but unstable and often confrontational American vocalist Malcolm Mooney, a New York-based sculptor, with whom it recorded the material for an album, Prepared to Meet Thy Pnoom. As "Inner Space", and with both Johnson and Mooney present, the band appeared briefly in the 1969 film Kamasutra: Vollendung der Liebe backing singer Margarete Juvan. Unable to find a recording company willing to release the album, the group continued its studio work until it had material for what became its first release, Monster Movie (1969). This album contained new versions of two songs previously recorded for Prepared to Meet Thy Pnoom, "Father Cannot Yell" and "Outside My Door". Other material recorded around the same time was released in 1981 as Delay 1968. Mooney's ranting vocals emphasized the music's sheer strangeness and hypnotic quality, which was influenced particularly by garage rock, psychedelic rock and funk. Repetition was stressed on bass and drums, particularly on the track "Yoo Doo Right", which had been edited down from a six-hour improvisation to take up a mere single side of vinyl. Liebezeit's tight but multifarious drumming was crucial in carrying the music.

Mooney made his last recordings with Can in December 1969 before returning to America around the end of the year on a psychiatrist's advice, having been told that getting away from Can's chaotic music would be good for his mental health. The liner notes of the CD reissue of Monster Movie say that he suffered a nervous breakdown ("caught in a Can groove"), shouting "upstairs, downstairs" repeatedly. He was replaced in May 1970 by the more understated Kenji "Damo" Suzuki, a young Japanese traveler Czukay and Liebezeit found busking outside a Munich café. Though he knew only a handful of guitar chords and improvised most of his lyrics (as opposed to committing them to paper), he was asked to perform with the band that night. The band's first record with Suzuki was Soundtracks (1970), a compilation of music made for films that also contained two earlier tracks recorded with Mooney. Suzuki's lyrics were usually in English and sometimes in Japanese (for example, in "Oh Yeah" and "Doko E").

Middle years: 1971–1973
The next few years saw Can release its most acclaimed works. While its earlier recordings tended to be at least loosely based on traditional song structures, on its mid-career albums the band reverted to an extremely fluid improvisational style. The double album Tago Mago (1971) is often seen as groundbreaking, influential and deeply unconventional, based on intensely rhythmic jazz-inspired drumming, improvised guitar and keyboard soloing (frequently intertwining), tape edits as composition, and Suzuki's idiosyncratic vocalisms. Czukay said it "was an attempt in achieving a mystery musical world from light to darkness and return."

In 1971 the band composed the music for the three-part German-language television crime miniseries Das Messer ("The Knife"), directed by Rolf von Sydow. The track "Spoon" was used as the theme song and, released as a single, reached number 6 in the German singles chart.

Tago Mago was followed in 1972 by Ege Bamyasi, a more accessible but still avant-garde record which featured "Spoon" and the catchy "Vitamin C".  Czukay said, "We could achieve an excellent dry and ambient sound... [Ege Bamyasi] reflects the group being in a lighter mood."

It was followed by Future Days in 1973, an early example of ambient music that also includes the pop song "Moonshake". Czukay said, "'Bel Air' [the 20-minute track that takes up all of side two on the original Future Days LP] showed Can in a state of being an electric symphony group performing a peaceful though sometimes dramatic landscape painting."

Suzuki left soon after the recording of Future Days to marry his German girlfriend, and become a Jehovah's Witness. Vocals were taken over by Karoli and Schmidt, but after Suzuki's departure, fewer of Can's tracks featured vocals, as the band experimented with the ambient music it had begun with Future Days.

Later years: 1974–1979
Soon Over Babaluma from 1974 continued in the ambient style of Future Days, but with some of the abrasive edge of Tago Mago and Ege Bamyasi. In 1975, Can signed with Virgin Records in the UK and EMI/Harvest in Germany, appearing the same year on BBC's Old Grey Whistle Test in a memorable performance of Vernal Equinox in which Schmidt played one keyboard section with a series of rapid karate chops. Shortly after the appearance Schmidt suffered a broken leg which led to cancellation of the band's UK tour.

The later albums Landed (1975) and Flow Motion (1976) saw Can moving toward a somewhat more conventional style as its recording technology improved. The disco single "I Want More" from Flow Motion became its only hit record outside Germany. Co-written by live sound mixer Peter Gilmour, it reached No 26 in the UK charts in October 1976, which prompted an appearance on Top of the Pops, where Czukay performed with a double bass. In 1977 Can was joined by former Traffic bassist Rosko Gee and percussionist Rebop Kwaku Baah, both of whom provided vocals, appearing on the albums Saw Delight (1977), Out of Reach (1978) and Can (1979).

During this period Czukay was pushed to the fringes of the group's activity due to disagreements about the band's creative direction and his failure as a bass guitarist to keep up with the growth of the other musicians. Bass guitar was something Czukay had "taken up almost by default" and he readily admitted his limitations on the instrument. After Gee joined Can, Czukay made sounds using shortwave radios, Morse code keys, tape recorders and other sundry objects. He left Can in late 1977 and did not appear on the albums Out of Reach or Can, although he was involved with production work for the latter album. The band seemed to be in a hiatus shortly afterwards, but reunions have taken place on several occasions since.

After the split and reunion
Since the split, all the former members have been involved in musical projects, often as session musicians for other artists. In 1986 they briefly reformed, with original vocalist Mooney, to record Rite Time (released in 1989).  There was a further reunion in 1991 by Karoli, Liebezeit, Mooney and Schmidt to record a track for the Wim Wenders film Until the End of the World and in August 1999 by Karoli, Liebezeit and Schmidt with Jono Podmore to record a cover of "The Third Man Theme" for Grönland Records' compilation album Pop 2000. In 1999 the four core members of Can, Karoli, Liebezeit, Schmidt and Czukay, performed live at the same show, although playing separately with their current solo projects (Sofortkontakt, Club Off Chaos, Kumo and U-She respectively). Can have since been the subject of numerous compilations, live albums and samples. In 2004, the band began a series of Super Audio CD remasters of its back catalog, which were finished in 2006.

Michael Karoli died of cancer on 17 November 2001; Jaki Liebezeit died of pneumonia on 22 January 2017, and Czukay died of natural causes on 5 September 2017, thus leaving Irmin Schmidt as the sole surviving consistent member of the group.

Solo works
Holger Czukay recorded several ambient albums and collaborated with David Sylvian among others. Jaki Liebezeit played extensively with bassists Jah Wobble and Bill Laswell, with a drum ensemble called Drums off Chaos and in 2005 with Datenverarbeiter on the online album Givt. Michael Karoli recorded a reggae album with Polly Eltes before his death, and Irmin Schmidt has begun working with drummer Martin Atkins, producing a remix for the industrial band The Damage Manual and a cover of "Banging the Door" for a Public Image Ltd tribute album, both released on Atkins' label, Invisible Records. Karoli formed Sofortkontakt! for the Can reunion shows in 1999 with Mark Spybey, who had previously been associated with Dead Voices on Air, Zoviet France, Reformed Faction and Download. The band also featured Alexander Schoenert, Felix Guttierez of Jelly Planet, Thomas Hopf and Mandjao Fati. Karoli also performed on numerous occasions with Damo Suzuki's Network. Damo Suzuki returned to music in 1983 and since then he has been playing live improvisational shows around the world with local musicians and members of touring bands at various points, sometimes issuing live albums. Malcolm Mooney recorded an album as singer for the band Tenth Planet in 1998. Rosko Gee has been the bassist in the live band on Harald Schmidt's TV show in Germany since 1995. Rebop Kwaku Baah died in 1983 following a brain hemorrhage.

Archive releases
Can released a compilation album Limited Edition in 1974, and expanded it to a double album Unlimited Edition in 1976 from their unreleased studio recordings. Delay 1968, released in 1981, was a compilation of unreleased 1968–1969 recordings. Cannibalism 2, a compilation album of album and single material, also included one unreleased song, "Melting Away", from the 1960s.

In 1995 The Peel Sessions was released, a compilation of Can recordings at the BBC. In 1999 Can Box was released, with a Can video documentary, a concert recording from 1972 and a double live CD compiled by Michael Karoli and later released separately as Can Live Music (Live 1971–1977). Unreleased live music of Can have been also released on the 40th Anniversary Edition of Tago Mago in 2011 and 17 LP collection box Can in 2014.

The Lost Tapes, released in 2012, was overseen by Irmin Schmidt and Daniel Miller, compiled by Schmidt and Jono Podmore, and edited by Podmore.

Music

Style
Holger Czukay and Irmin Schmidt were both pupils of Karlheinz Stockhausen, and Can inherited a strong grounding in his musical theory; the latter was trained as a classical pianist, while Michael Karoli was a pupil of Holger Czukay and brought the influence of gypsy music through his esoteric studies. Drummer Jaki Liebezeit had strong jazz leanings. The band's sound was originally intended to be based on the sound of ethnic music, so when the band decided to pick up the garage rock sound, original member David Johnson left. This world music trend was later exemplified on albums such as Ege Bamyasi (the name meaning "Aegean okra" in Turkish), Future Days and Saw Delight, and by incorporating new band members with different nationalities. A series of tracks on Can albums, known as "Ethnological Forgery Series", abbreviated to "E.F.S", demonstrated the band's ability to successfully recreate ethnic-sounding music. They constructed their music largely through collective spontaneous composition, sampling themselves in the studio and editing down the results; bassist and chief engineer Czukay referred to Can's live and studio performances as "instant compositions".

The band's early rock influences include The Beatles and The Velvet Underground as well as Jimi Hendrix, Sly Stone and Frank Zappa. The band have admitted that the beginning of Can's "Father Cannot Yell" was inspired by the Velvet Underground's "European Son". Malcolm Mooney's voice has been compared to that of James Brown (an acknowledged hero of the band members) and their early style, rooted in psychedelic music, drew comparisons with Pink Floyd. Czukay's extensive editing has occasionally been compared to the late-'60s music of trumpeter Miles Davis (such as In a Silent Way and Bitches Brew): Can and Davis both would record long groove-intensive improvisations, then edit the best bits together for their albums. Czukay and Teo Macero (Davis's producer and editor) both had roots in the musique concrète of the 1940s and '50s. Irmin Schmidt stated in a discussion with Michael Karoli in 1996 concerning the various citations of influences upon their music: "You know, it's funny that in spite of all the supposed influences on us that have been written about, the one overriding influence has never been mentioned: Michael von Biel."

Damo Suzuki was a very different singer from Mooney, with a multilingual (he claimed to sing in "the language of the Stone Age") and often inscrutable vocal style. With Suzuki, the band made their most critically and commercially successful albums. The rhythm section's work on Tago Mago has been especially praised: one critic writes that much of the album is based on "long improvisations built around hypnotic rhythm patterns"; another writes that "Halleluhwah" finds them "pounding out a monster trance/funk beat".

Legacy and influence
The Lumerians and Happy Mondays have cited Can as an influence. Critic Simon Reynolds wrote that "Can's pan-global avant-funk anticipated many of the moves made by sampladelic dance genres like trip hop, ethnotechno and ambient jungle." Brian Eno made a short film in tribute to Can, while John Frusciante of the Red Hot Chili Peppers appeared at the Echo Awards ceremony, at which Can were awarded the most prestigious music award in Germany, to pay tribute to guitarist Michael Karoli. Radiohead covered Can's song "The Thief" frequently in the early 2000s, and cited them as an influence on their 2000 album Kid A. Mark E. Smith of the Fall paid tribute to Suzuki with the track "I Am Damo Suzuki" on the 1985 album This Nation's Saving Grace. The Jesus and Mary Chain covered "Mushroom" live in the mid-1980s. Mark Hollis of Talk Talk had mentioned Can several times as an influence for their later albums, Spirit of Eden and Laughing Stock. 

At least five notable bands have named themselves in tribute to Can: the Mooney Suzuki for Malcolm Mooney and Damo Suzuki; the indie rock band Spoon after the hit "Spoon"; the electronic band Egebamyasi, formed by Scottish musician Mr Egg in 1984, after Can's album Ege Bamyasi; Hunters & Collectors after a song on the Landed album; and Moonshake, named for a track on Future Days, and formed by ex-Wolfhounds frontman David Callahan. The Scottish writer Alan Warner has written two novels in tribute to two different Can members (Morvern Callar to Holger Czukay and The Man Who Walks to Michael Karoli respectively). The Sacrilege remix album features remixes of Can tracks by artists who were influenced by Can, including Sonic Youth and U.N.K.L.E. Their ethnomusicological tendencies pre-date the craze for world music in the 1980s. While not nearly as influential on electronic music as Kraftwerk, they were important early pioneers of ambient music, along with Tangerine Dream and the aforementioned band. Many groups working in the post-rock genre can look to Can as an influence as part of the larger krautrock scene, as can New Prog bands such as The Mars Volta. Rolling Stone called the group a "pioneering space rock band". Kanye West has sampled "Sing Swan Song" on his song "Drunk & Hot Girls" from his 2007 album Graduation. The UK band Loop was deeply influenced by Can for their repetitive polyrhythmic style, covering Can's "Mother Sky" on their Fade Out album. The Yugoslav progressive/psychedelic rock band Igra Staklenih Perli, heavily influenced by Can, on their self-titled debut album released the song "Pečurka" ("Mushroom") as a tribute to Can.

The band is name-checked as a formative influence in LCD Soundsystem's debut single "Losing My Edge". Oasis' 2008 single "The Shock of the Lightning" was inspired by Can and Neu!.

Improvisation, recording and live shows

Much of Can's music was based on free improvisation and then edited for the studio albums. For example, when preparing a soundtrack, only Irmin Schmidt would view the film and then give the rest of the band a general description of the scenes they would be scoring. This assisted in the improvised soundtrack being successful both inside and outside the film's context.

Can's live shows often melded spontaneous improvisation of this kind with songs appearing on their albums. The track "Colchester Finale", appearing on the Can Live album, incorporates portions of "Halleluhwah" into a composition lasting over half an hour. Early concerts found Mooney and Suzuki often able to shock audiences. The actor David Niven was asked by Czukay what he had thought of a concert, Niven replied: "It was great, but I didn't know it was music." After the departure of Suzuki, the music grew in intensity without a vocal centre. The band maintained their ability to collectively improvise with or without central themes for hours at a time (their longest performance, in Berlin, lasted over six hours), resulting in a large archive of performances.

Can made attempts to find a new vocalist after the departure of Damo Suzuki, although no one quite fit the position. In 1975, folk singer Tim Hardin took the lead vocal spot and played guitar with Can for one song, at two gigs, performing his own "The Lady Came From Baltimore". Malaysian vocalist Thaiga Raj Raja Ratnam played six dates with the band between January and March 1976. Another temporary vocalist, Englishman Michael Cousins, toured with Can from March (France) to April (Germany) 1976.

Band members
Michael Karoli – guitar, vocals, violin (1968–1979, 1986, 1988, 1991, 1999; died 2001)
Jaki Liebezeit – drums, percussion (1968–1979, 1986, 1988, 1991, 1999; died 2017)
Irmin Schmidt – keyboards, vocals (1968–1979, 1986, 1988, 1991, 1999)
Holger Czukay – bass, sound engineer, electronics, vocals, French horn (1968–1977, 1986, 1988; died 2017)
David C. Johnson – reeds, winds, electronics and tape manipulation (1968)
Malcolm Mooney – vocals (1968–1970, 1986-1988, 1991)
Damo Suzuki – vocals (1970–1973)
Rosko Gee – bass, vocals (1977–1979)
Rebop Kwaku Baah – percussion, vocals (1977–1979; died 1983)

Additional collaborators
Manni Löhe – vocals, percussion and flute (1968)
Duncan Fallowell – lyrics (1974)
René Tinner – recording engineer (1973–1979, 1986, 1991)
Olaf Kübler of Amon Düül – tenor saxophone (1975)
Tim Hardin – vocals & guitar (November 1975) (died 1980)
Thaiga Raj Raja Ratnam – vocals (January–March 1976)
Michael Cousins – vocals (March–April 1976)
Peter Gilmour – lyrics, live sound mixing (later 1970s)
Jono Podmore – recording engineer, bass (1999), soundprocessing and editing engineer (1999, 2003, 2011–2012)

Timeline

Discography

Monster Movie (1969)
Tago Mago (1971)
Ege Bamyasi (1972)
Future Days (1973)
Soon Over Babaluma (1974)
Landed (1975)
Flow Motion (1976)
Saw Delight (1977)
Out of Reach (1978)
Can (1979)
Rite Time (1989)

Videography
Romantic Warriors IV: Krautrock (2019)

References

Works cited

Bibliography
 
 Bussy, Pascal and Andy Hall. The Can Book. Saf Publishing, 1989.
 Bussy, Pascal. Kraftwerk: Man, Machine and Music. SAF Publishing, 2005. 
 The New Musical Express Book of Rock, Star Books, 1975, .
 Rock: The Rough Guide (2nd edition). Penguin, 1999.
 Strong, Martin C. Great Rock Discography. (5th edition), MOJO Books, 2000.
 Stubbs, David. Future Days: Krautrock and the Building of Modern Germany. Faber & Faber Rock Music, 2014.

External links

 Official website (Spoonrecords.com)
 Biography at Mute Records
 
 Full discography including solo albums and a breakdown of every gig played

 
Krautrock musical groups
Free improvisation ensembles
Ambient music groups
German art rock groups
German experimental rock groups
Mute Records artists
Musical groups established in 1968
Musical groups disestablished in 1999
1968 establishments in West Germany
1999 disestablishments in Germany
Musical groups from Cologne
German progressive rock groups
German experimental musical groups
German psychedelic rock music groups
Liberty Records artists
United Artists Records artists
Virgin Records artists
Harvest Records artists
Restless Records artists